Utetheisa fractifascia is a moth in the family Erebidae. It was described by Alfred Ernest Wileman in 1911. It is found in Taiwan.

References

fractifascia
Moths described in 1911
Moths of Taiwan